Filip Kozłowski (born 11 July 1995) is a Polish professional footballer who plays as a striker for I liga side Skra Częstochowa.

Club career
On 5 August 2020, he joined GKS Katowice.

External links

References

1995 births
People from Inowrocław
Sportspeople from Kuyavian-Pomeranian Voivodeship
Living people
Polish footballers
Association football forwards
Gopło Kruszwica players
Pogoń Szczecin players
Rozwój Katowice players
Chojniczanka Chojnice players
Elana Toruń players
GKS Katowice players
Skra Częstochowa players
Ekstraklasa players
I liga players
II liga players
III liga players